The women's pentathlon event at the 1975 Pan American Games was held in Mexico City on 15 and 16 October. It was the last edition where the 200 metres was contested as the last event of the pentathlon before being replaced by the 800 metres in 1979.

Results

References

Athletics at the 1975 Pan American Games
1975